Asmunda is a genus of sea snails, marine gastropod mollusks in the family Pyramidellidae, the pyrams and their allies.

Species
Species within the genus Asmunda include:
 Asmunda ambulatia (Laseron, 1951)
 Asmunda belsantii Saurin, 1959
 Asmunda chuttina Saurin, 1959
 Asmunda clara Saurin, 1959
 Asmunda elegantula (A. Adams, 1860)
 Asmunda exilissima (Nomura, 1938)
 Asmunda ludovica (Thiele, 1925)
 Asmunda metula (A. Adams, 1860)
 Asmunda secta (Saurin, 1958)
 Asmunda silvii Saurin, 1959
 Asmunda tenuicostata (Robba, Di Geronimo, Chaimanee, Negri & Sanfilippo, 2004)
 Asmunda tribulationis (Hedley, 1909)
 Asmunda turrita (C. B. Adams, 1852)

References

External links
 To World Register of Marine Species

Pyramidellidae